Leuconostoc citreum is a vancomycin-resistant, Gram-positive, coccus-shaped bacterium, with type strain NCDO 1837. Its genome has been sequenced.

References

Further reading

External links
LPSN

Type strain of Leuconostoc citreum at BacDive -  the Bacterial Diversity Metadatabase

Lactobacillaceae
Bacteria described in 1989